The Dicastery for the Eastern Churches (also called Dicastery for the Oriental Churches), previously named Congregation for the Oriental Churches or Congregation for the Eastern Churches, is a dicastery of the Roman Curia responsible for contact with the Eastern Catholic churches for the sake of assisting their development and protecting their rights. It also maintains whole and entire in the one Catholic Church the heritage and canon law of the various Eastern Catholic traditions. It has exclusive authority over the following regions: Egypt and the Sinai Peninsula, Eritrea and northern Ethiopia, southern Albania and Bulgaria, Cyprus, Greece, Iran, Iraq, Lebanon, Israel (and Palestinian territories), Syria, Jordan and Turkey, and also oversees jurisdictions based in Romania, Southern Italy, Hungary, India and Ukraine.

It was founded by the motu proprio Dei providentis of Pope Benedict XV as the "Sacred Congregation for the Oriental Church" on 1 May 1917.

Structure
Patriarchs and major archbishops of the Oriental churches, and the president of the Pontifical Council for Promoting Christian Unity, are members of this congregation by virtue of the law itself. The consultors and officials are selected to reflect the diversity of rites.

Authority 
This congregation has authority over:
 all matters which relate to the Oriental churches referred to the Holy See (structure and organisation of the churches; exercise of the offices of teaching, sanctifying and ruling; status, rights, and obligations of persons), and
 the ad limina visits of Eastern bishops.

This congregation's authority does not include the exclusive authority of the Congregations for the Doctrine of the Faith and for the Causes of Saints, of the Apostolic Penitentiary, the Supreme Tribunal of the Apostolic Signatura, and the Tribunal of the Roman Rota, including what pertains to dispensations from a marriage ratum sed non consummatum ('"ratified but not consummated"). In matters which affect the Eastern as well as the Latin churches, the congregation operates, if the matter is important enough, in consultation with the dicastery that has authority in the matter for the Latin Church. The Latin Patriarchate of Jerusalem is exempt from the authority of the congregation, being directly subject to the Holy See.

The congregation pays special attention to communities of Eastern Catholic faithful who live in the territory of the Latin Church and attends to their spiritual needs by providing visitors and even their own hierarchs, so far as possible and where numbers and circumstances require, in consultation with the congregation competent to establish particular churches in the region.

In regions where the Eastern churches have been dominant from ancient times, apostolic and missionary activity is solely the responsibility of this congregation, even if the above is carried out by Latin Church missionaries.

The congregation collaborates with the Pontifical Council for Promoting Christian Unity in matters that concern relations with non-Catholic Eastern churches and with the Pontifical Council for Interreligious Dialogue in matters within the scope of the latter.

History
On 6 January 1862, Pope Pius IX established the Congregatio de Propaganda Fide pro negotiis ritus orientalis, a section of the Congregation for the Propagation of the Faith "for the affairs of the Oriental Rite", with the apostolic constitution Romani Pontifici. Pope Benedict XV declared it independent on 1 May 1917 with the motu proprio Dei providentis and named it the Congregatio pro Ecclesia Orientali (Congregation for the Eastern Church). It was presided over by the pope and a cardinal filled the role of Secretary. There were also councillors, chosen from among the more distinguished clergy and those experienced in issues affecting these churches. Pope Paul VI changed its name by adopting the plural Congregatio pro Ecclesiis Orientalibus (Congregation for Eastern Churches) with the apostolic constitution Regimini Ecclesiae Universae of 15 August 1967, reflecting the major decree Orientalium Ecclesiarum of the Second Vatican Council. Pope Francis, with his apostolic constitution Praedicate evangelium, which took effect on 5 June 2022, changed its name to the Dicastery for the Eastern Churches.

The current prefect of the dicastery is Claudio Gugerotti. The secretary is Michel Jalakh.  The undersecretary is Flavio Pace. Two are clerics of the Latin Church with Jalakh being a Maronite.

Leadership

From 1917 to 1967, the pope held the title of prefect of the Congregation, which was headed by a cardinal secretary. From then until 2022 it was headed by a cardinal prefect. When Claudio Gugerotti was named to head this Curia office, by then called a dicastery, he was an archbishop.

Notes

References

Footnotes

Bibliography
Noonan, James-Charles, Jr. The Church Visible: The Ceremonial Life and Protocol of the Roman Catholic Church (New York: VIKING, 1996). 
Norwich, John Julius. Absolute Monarchs: A History of the Papacy (New York: Random House, 2011).

External links
Official website
Oriente Cattolico: official publication of the Congregation for the Oriental Churches
GCatholic.org

 
Christian organizations established in 1917
Catholic organizations established in the 20th century
1917 establishments in Vatican City